The  (Quechua  'horn',  'blow', also spelled) is a type of trumpet used by the indigenous peoples of Peru and the Andes. It is usually made from cattle horn or metal, and is used in annual fertility rituals.

References 

 

Natural horns and trumpets
Peruvian musical instruments
Pre-Columbian South American musical instruments